The Rural Municipality of Buckland No. 491 is a rural municipality (RM) in the Canadian province of Saskatchewan within Census Division No. 15 and  Division No. 5. It is located near the City of Prince Albert.

History 
The RM of Buckland No. 491 incorporated as a rural municipality on December 11, 1911.

Geography 
Rural municipalities that neighbour the RM of Buckland No. 491 include the RM of Shellbrook No. 493 to the west, the RM of Paddockwood No. 520 to the north, the RM of Garden River No. 490 to the east, and the RM of Prince Albert No. 461 to the south.

Communities and localities 
The following communities are located within the RM.

Albertville
Alingly
Henribourg
Little Red River IR #106C
Redwing
Spruce Home
Sturgeon Lake IR #101
Wahpaton 94A Indian reserve
White Star

Demographics 

Government 
The RM of Buckland No. 491 is governed by an elected municipal council and an appointed administrator that meets on the second Monday of every month. The reeve of the RM is Don Fyrk while its administrator is Cori Sarginson. The RM's office is located in Prince Albert.

Transportation 
Roads
Highway 355—serves Albertville and Alingly
Highway 2

See also 
List of rural municipalities in Saskatchewan

References

External links 

B

Division No. 15, Saskatchewan